Al Haymah Al Kharijiyah District is a district of the Sana'a Governorate, Yemen. , the district had a population of 58,454 inhabitants.

References

Districts of Sanaa Governorate
Al Haymah Al Kharijiyah District